is a closed railway station on the defunct Hiroo Line in Obihiro, Hokkaido, Japan. Now owned by the Kofuku town residents' association, even after its closure in 1987, it remains a popular sightseeing spot because of its name, which means "happiness" in Japanese.

Lines

Station layout
The original station building remains standing, and many people paste business cards and messages on the walls of the waiting room, hoping for happiness.

History
The station opened on 1 November 1956. It closed in 1987 when the entire line closed just before privatization of Japanese National Railways (JNR).

The station become famous after it was featured on a Japanese NHK TV travel documentary programme in 1973. In fiscal 2012, it was visited by about 175,000 people, making it one of the top tourist attractions in the area.

The ageing station structure was scheduled to be renovated by Obihiro city government between September and November 2013, at a cost of 33 million yen.

Surrounding area
The station takes its name from the name of the area in which it is located. Although the area was originally called Kōshin, it was changed to Kōfuku in around 1910 by combining the "Kō" of Kōshin with "Fuku" from Fukui, denoting the farmers from Fukui Prefecture who moved to the area around 1902 after being displaced by flooding.

References

External links

  
 Tourist information provided by city of Obihiro 

Railway stations in Hokkaido Prefecture
Railway stations in Japan opened in 1956
Railway stations closed in 1987
1987 disestablishments in Japan